Telephone numbers in Papua New Guinea consist of mostly seven and some eight digit numbers (fixed), or eight digit numbers (mobile).

The international prefix for Papua New Guinea was changed from ‘05’ to ’00’ in 2010.

Landline

Other allocations

Mobile allocations

Older information
Broadly numbers are allocated to the following categories:

     0xx(x)   = operator services
     180 xxxx = free call services
     188 xxxx = local call services
     2xx xxxx = satellite telephones
     3xx xxxx = Port Moresby/Papua region
     4xx xxxx = Lae/Morobe region
     5xx xxxx = Mount Hagen/Highlands region
     6xx xxxx = Daru/Fly region
     69x xxxx = AMPS mobile (no longer in use)
     68x xxxx = Mobile GSM
     7xx xxxx = Goroka/Eastern Highlands region
     8xx xxxx = Madang/Sepik region
 9xx xxxx = New Guinea Islands region

See also 
 Communications in Papua New Guinea

References

Papua New Guinea
Telecommunications in Papua New Guinea
Telephone numbers